2013–14 in Kenyan football may refer to:
 2013 in Kenyan football
 2014 in Kenyan football